The Centre for Co-operation in Science and Technology among Developing Societies (CCSTDS)  (erstwhile CICS) is mandated to promote science- and technology-related (ST) activities for the mutual benefit of the scientists of developing countries. It is a Tamil Nadu society registered under The Tamil Nadu Societies Registration Act, 1975.

The Centre has a major focus for ST training of developing country scientists from Asia, Africa, Latin America and Arab regions. Other programmes include Travel Fellowship to Indian Scientists to participate in international conferences, workshops outside India, a training programme for women scientists of India on Intellectual Property Rights and a motivational programme for high school students.

Evolution of CICS

Recognizing the role of Science and Technology, the International Council for Science (ICSU) established a Committee for Science and Technology in Developing Countries (COSTED) in 1966. The COSTED Secretariat was located in Chennai and was vested with the specific responsibility of promoting and strengthening regional scientific networks in specific areas of Science and Technology.

Considering that the COSTED Secretariat in Chennai had experience in regional science and technology promotion, co-operation, diffusion and capacity building, the Indian National Science Academy (INSA), decided to establish a successor organization to COSTED under the auspices of INSA to promote ST activities for the mutual benefit of scientists of developing countries. In 2005 the Centre for Co-operation in Science and Technology among Developing Societies (CCSTDS) was established to address ST needs of Asia, Africa and Latin America.

Objectives of the Centre
 To promote co-operation in S and T between India and other developing countries.
 To serve as a bridge between S and T institutions in India and those of other developing countries.
 To build capacity in S and T in developing societies.
 To provide a forum for experience sharing in the design and development of ST programmes including exchange of information, databases, science communication, traditional knowledge & IPR related activities.
 To organize training/workshops in S and T, including science policy.
 To encourage the mobility of scientists, especially young scientists, to pursue training in Indian institutions.
 To exchange co-operative endeavour in areas of mutual interest and concern such as biodiversity and sustainable development, waste management and technology management.

References

External links 
Official Website

Scientific organisations based in India